Kenneth S. Apfel (born October 12, 1948) is the 13th Commissioner of Social Security in the United States, filling a four-year term of office that ran from 1997 through 2001.

Background
Apfel was born in Shrewsbury, Massachusetts. A graduate of University of Massachusetts Amherst, Northeastern University, and University of Texas at Austin, he started his federal career as a Presidential Management Intern at the United States Department of Labor.

Since 2006, he has held the position of Professor at the University of Maryland's School of Public Policy.

Prior to becoming Commissioner of the Social Security Administration in 1997, he had served as Associate Director for Human Resources at the Office of Management and Budget since 1995, and as Assistant Secretary for Management and Budget at the United States Department of Health and Human Services from 1993 to 1995.

Apfel is a Fellow of the National Academy of Public Administration.

References

External links

1948 births
Clinton administration personnel
Commissioners of the Social Security Administration
Living people
Maryland Democrats
Northeastern University alumni
People from Shrewsbury, Massachusetts
United States Department of Health and Human Services officials
United States Office of Management and Budget officials
University of Maryland, College Park faculty
University of Massachusetts Amherst alumni
Lyndon B. Johnson School of Public Affairs alumni
Center on Budget and Policy Priorities